Oregon Route 203 is an Oregon state highway running from Interstate 84 near La Grande to I-84 near Baker City. OR 203 is composed of part of the La Grande-Baker Highway No. 66 (see Oregon highways and routes) and the Medical Springs Highway No. 340.

Route description 

OR 203 begins at an intersection with I-84 and U.S. Route 30 near La Grande. After the concurrency ends, OR 203 continues southeast to Medical Springs, then turns south, southwest, and west to an intersection with I-84 near Baker City, where it ends.

The official description of OR 203 indicates that it ends at an intersection with OR 86 near Baker City.  Current Department of Transportation charts, however, suggest that this description is outdated.

History 
Highway 203 was first opened in 1935. Over the decades that followed, various sections of Catherine Creek southeast of Union were channelized to avoid impinging on the roadway. This area of Catherine Creek has recently been the focus of restoration efforts, since some sections support high populations of threatened anadromous fish.

Major intersections

References 

203
Transportation in Baker County, Oregon
Transportation in Union County, Oregon